Kampala Medical Chambers Hospital (KMCH), is a private hospital in Uganda.

Location
The hospital is located at 73 Buganda Road, on  Nakasero Hill, in the Central Division of Kampala, Uganda's capital city. The coordinates of Kampala Medical Chambers Hospital are: 0°19'30.0"N 32°34'31.0"E (Latitude:0.325000; Longitude:32.575278).

Overview
Prior to 2014, three specialized doctors; Romano Byaruhanga, Joseph Turyabahika and Wilson Were, established a consultation clinic at 14A Buganda Road, in the center of Kampala, which they named Kampala Medical Chambers Clinic. In 2014, following the completion of a new multi-storey building (Jowiro House) at 73 Buganda Road, the clinic relocated to the new premises and began to admit inpatients, although it continued to attend to outpatients. The new hospital complex was named Kampala Medical Chambers Hospital. Kampala Medical Chambers Hospital is a member of the International Health Network, a health maintenance organisation The hospital and clinic played a role in the introduction of the menstrual cup to Ugandan patients.

Hospital services
The following services are on offer at Kampala Medical Chambers Hospital, as of November 2020: 1. Causality Department with Ambulance Services 2. Internal Medicine 3. Pediatrics 4. Endoscopy 5. Maternity and Family Planning (including Prenatal Care) 6. General Medical Care including wellness examinations 7. Obstetrics and Gynecology 8. General Surgery and 9. Dental Services.

See also
List of hospitals in Uganda

References

External links
 Uganda: Private Healthcare Now Rivals Treatment in India in Cost

Hospitals in Kampala
Kampala Central Division
Hospital buildings completed in 2014
2014 establishments in Uganda